Cerbaiola is a small village (curazia) located in San Marino. It is the only curazia belonging to the municipality (castello) of Montegiardino.

Geography
The village is located in the south-western area of its municipality, on a road linking Montegiardino and Fiorentino.

See also
Montegiardino

Curazie in San Marino
Montegiardino